The Ferrari 312B is a Formula One racing car designed and built by Scuderia Ferrari. It was the successor to the Ferrari 312 and was used from 1970 until early 1975. The original 312B was developed into the 312B2 and 312B3.

History
The early 1970s saw the return of success to the Scuderia; the unlucky Chris Amon left, while Jacky Ickx returned and was joined by Clay Regazzoni. Under the direction of Mauro Forghieri, Ferrari developed a new Tipo 001 flat-12 engine, colloquially referred to as a "boxer" (although not a real boxer engine), giving a lower center of gravity and a clear airflow beneath the rear wing.

During the car's first season, in 1970, Ickx battled with Lotus's Jochen Rindt and won three Grands Prix, while the Italian Grand Prix was won by Clay Regazzoni, following the death of Rindt in a practice session preceding the race. In the remaining races, Ickx could not close the points gap to Rindt for the drivers title, and Lotus won the Constructors Championship ahead of Ferrari.

The 1971 season started with a win by new signing Mario Andretti. Although being presented in January, the 312 B2 debuted at the third round in Monaco, followed by the Dutch Grand Prix success for Ickx. However the B2 suffered with handling problems: the combination of the innovative rear suspension and the new Firestone tyres gave severe vibrations when driven close to the limit. Forghieri designed and fitted winglets to the front wings of the car for the British Grand Prix that year; however these were not seen again afterwards. Ferrari ultimately came third in the Constructors Championship, as Jackie Stewart and Tyrrell dominated the season.

In 1972 Ferrari fielded a revised B2 with a more conventional rear suspension, but could not keep up with the progress of the competition, dropping to fourth at the end of the year. Ickx won the 1972 German Grand Prix at the Nürburgring, but this was to be his last GP win.

During the season, Forghieri experimented with a new front bodywork that was very similar to the front bodywork of the Tyrrell 003; it was tested and fitted to the cars for the second race in South Africa that year, however it was not used again afterwards due to it making the cars uncompetitive. Forghieri also designed a radical new car featuring a square bodywork and full width nose on a very short wheelbase. This new 312 B3 was tested by Merzario and Ickx but never raced in a Grand Prix. The Italian press nicknamed it the spazzaneve (snowplow). 

For 1973, FIAT executives imposed a new technical staff and Forghieri was transferred to the experimental department; his role was taken by Sandro Colombo, a former Gilera and Innocenti engineer. The spazzaneve project was discarded and replaced by a new design, still named 312 B3. A new full monocoque chassis was built by specialist English company TC Prototypes, under John Thompson's guidance, and the engine became a fully stressed member.

In the first races, Ferrari still used the old 312 B2: the car was no longer competitive, and Ickx only managed one fourth place at the opening GP of the season. The new 312 B3 debuted at the Spanish Grand Prix, but proved to be slow and unreliable achieving even worse results. Throughout the 1973 season, Ferrari was outclassed, and they even skipped some Grands Prix, notably the Nürburgring.  Ickx left the team halfway through the season in order to contest the 1973 German Grand Prix at the Nürburgring in a McLaren, where he took 3rd place behind the Tyrrells of Stewart and François Cevert, despite being given an older-spec Ford Cosworth V8 and the hardest compound of tyres available.

During the summer Forghieri was recalled as technical director and set about revising the B3 incorporating some of the ideas used on his radical spazzaneve.

For 1974 Ferrari fielded a heavily revised car, named 312 B3-74, and signed BRM drivers Niki Lauda and Clay Regazzoni.

The car was succeeded by the 312T which was introduced for the 1975 Formula One season.

Complete Formula One World Championship results

 In 1975, 63.5 points were scored driving the Ferrari 312T.

References

External links

 article about 312B 
 Tremayne, David & Hughes, Mark (1998). The Concise Encyclopedia Of Formula One, Paragon.

312B
Cars powered by boxer engines